is a railway station on the privately operated Chōshi Electric Railway Line in Chōshi, Chiba, Japan.

Lines

Station layout
The station is unstaffed, and consists of a side platform serving a single track. There is no station building or shelter.

History

Kimigahama Station opened on 21 June 1931. The original western-style station building fell into disrepair in the post-war years, and was eventually demolished, leaving just the platform. In December 1990, a white Italian-style archway was added, but this was partially demolished in February 2007, leaving just the bare pillars.

Passenger statistics
In fiscal 2010, the station was used by an average of 16 passengers daily (boarding passengers only). The passenger figures for previous years are as shown below.

Surrounding area
 Kimigahama beach
 Shiosai Park

See also
 List of railway stations in Japan

References

External links

 Choshi Electric Railway station information 

Stations of Chōshi Electric Railway Line
Railway stations in Chiba Prefecture
Railway stations in Japan opened in 1931